Cédrick or Cedrick is a given name. Notable people with the name include:

Cedrick Banks (born 1981), American professional basketball player
Cedrick Bowers (born 1978), left-handed Major League Baseball pitcher
Cédrick Desjardins (born 1985), Canadian professional ice hockey goaltender
Cédrick Fiston (born 1981), French-Guadeloupean footballer who plays striker
Cedrick Hardman (born 1948), former American Football defensive end
Cedrick Holt (born 1983), American football cornerback
Cedrick Kalombo Lukanda (born 1983), South African basketball player
Cedrick Mabwati (born 1992), Congolese football player
Cédrick Ramos (born 1983), French professional football player
Cedrick Wilson Sr. (born 1978), American football wide receiver
Cedrick Wilson Jr. (born 1995), son of the above and American football wide receiver